Bagavatha Hamsam Brahmasree Malliyoor Sree Sankaran Namboothiri (2 February 1921 – 2 August 2011) was a Bhagavata scholar who lived in Kerala.

References

1921 births
2011 deaths